The 1983 season of the ASFA Soccer League (now called the FFAS Soccer League) was the third season of association football competition in American Samoa. Nuu'uli FC won the championship, their first title.

References

FFAS Senior League seasons
Amer
football